Beddomeia tumida is a species of very small (4 ) freshwater snail that has a gill and an operculum. It is an aquatic operculate gastropod mollusc in the family Hydrobiidae, and is endemic to Australia.

It had not been spotted for 120 years and was listed by the IUCN as "critically endangered but possibly extinct", when in late 2021 one was found by researchers in yingina/Great Lake in the Central Plateau of Tasmania. A survey found 15 further snails.

See also
List of non-marine molluscs of Australia

References

External links

Hydrobiidae
Beddomeia
Gastropods of Australia
Endemic fauna of Australia
Critically endangered fauna of Australia
Gastropods described in 1889
Taxonomy articles created by Polbot